John Henry Vivian FRS (9 August 1785 – 10 February 1855) was a Welsh industrialist and politician of Cornish extraction. He was a member of the Vivian family.

Vivian was the son of John Vivian (1750–1826), of Truro, Cornwall, and his wife Betsey, daughter of the Reverend Richard Cranch, and the brother of Hussey Vivian, 1st Baron Vivian. He owned copper mining, copper smelting and trading businesses in Swansea (Vivian & Sons), Liverpool, Birmingham and London. Between 1832 and 1855 he sat as Member of Parliament for Swansea District.  He was a fellow of the Royal Society, a major in the Royal Stannary Artillery, a justice of the peace and a deputy lieutenant.

Vivian married Sarah, eldest daughter of Arthur Jones, of Reigate on 30 October 1816. Their eight children included Henry Vivian, 1st Baron Swansea, Sir Arthur Vivian and Richard Glynn Vivian. He died on 10 February 1855. His wife survived him by over 30 years and died on 8 September 1886.

The mineral vivianite (Fe3(PO4)2•8(H2O)) is named in his honour.

References

Further reading

External links 

Mr. John Henry Vivian
UWS Alumni
Archives Network Wales:Vivian family papers

1785 births
1855 deaths
History of Swansea
Members of the Parliament of the United Kingdom for Swansea constituencies
UK MPs 1832–1835
UK MPs 1835–1837
UK MPs 1837–1841
UK MPs 1841–1847
UK MPs 1847–1852
UK MPs 1852–1857
Fellows of the Royal Society
John Henry